The practice of prostitution in colonial India was influenced by the policies of British rule in India. During the 19th and 20th centuries the colonial government facilitated, regulated and allowed the existence of prostitution. Not only was prostitution in India affected by the policy of the Governor General of India, it was also influenced by the moral and political beliefs of the British authorities, and conflicts and tensions between the British authorities and the Indian populace at large.  The colonial government had a profound effect on prostitution in India, both legislatively and socially.

Cantonment Act of 1864
Although the governments of many Indian princely states had regulated prostitution prior to the 1860s, such regulation in British India was first ushered in by the Cantonment Act of 1864. The Cantonment Acts regulated and structured prostitution in the British military bases.  The structuring features of the Cantonment Acts provided for about twelve to fifteen Indian women for each regiment of British soldiers. Each regiment contained about a thousand soldiers. These women were kept in brothels called chaklas.  They were licensed by military officials and were allowed to consort with soldiers only. Most of the women came from poor families and had no other opportunities for social or economic independence.  The structural inequalities that pushed women into prostitution were often enforced by the colonial governments.

Furthermore, the Cantonment Act of 1864 provided for the establishment and extension of hospitals in cantonments. Women working in chaklas were often required to undergo medical examinations once a week, in order to examine them for traces of venereal diseases. Prostitutes were often confined against their wills in these prison hospitals, especially if they were found to have a venereal disease.  The Cantonment Act of 1864, originally meant for military bases, was eventually extended to the Presidencies and Provinces of British India. However, when military personnel were increasingly struck down by venereal diseases, more regulations were demanded.  This eventually led to the Indian Contagious Disease Acts.

Cantonment Act of 1895
As the practice of prostitution increasingly became a source of contention between Indians and the British, another Cantonment Act was enacted. This Act of 1895 explicitly outlawed any licensing or official approval of prostitution in cantonments.  This was seen as a strong measure to prevent the spread of venereal disease, and most of the military was opposed to the Act. The Cantonment Acts serve as examples of only some of the tension over prostitution in colonial India.

Contagious Disease Acts
Between 1864 and 1869 many parts of British India, including the British military cantonments, were subjected to the Contagious Disease Acts.   These Acts originated in Great Britain itself and were then introduced in British India and other British possessions. The Indian Contagious Disease Acts were similar in content, but wider in scope than the domestic Contagious Disease Acts. These Acts were meant as a response to the growing number of cases of venereal disease amongst the British military.  Historical records indicate that one in three reported Army illnesses were venereal diseases. The British saw the need for regulation of prostitution to protect their military men, and the issue of venereal diseases had become one of concern for the Quartermaster General of India, Sir Edward Chapman. The Contagious Disease Acts sought to prevent venereal diseases in military personnel through several regulations. The Acts required the registration of women engaged in prostitution. These women were often required to carry a license in the form of a card. Furthermore, it mandated the regular medical examination of female prostitutes.  If any of these women were found to be infected during an examination, they were required to undergo in-patient treatment. If they refused such treatment, they could be penalized by imprisonment. Once cured of their diseases, they were released.  None of these measures were applied to infected men. The Acts only targeted female prostitutes, as they were the only people subject to licensing and medical examinations.

Opposition to Contagious Diseases Acts
From the time the Contagious Disease Acts had been enacted, they were controversial. There was a growing Abolitionism movement that sought to end state-regulated prostitution. Some of this opposition came from the prominent feminist Josephine Butler. Feminists saw prostitutes as an obstacle to equality in society, and therefore sought to end state-sanctioned prostitution. Other Abolitionists viewed state sanctioned prostitution as morally offensive and harmful. In 1869, groups were formed in opposition to the Contagious Disease Acts, which included the National Association for the Repeal of the Contagious Diseases Act and the Ladies National Association for the Repeal of the Contagious Diseases Acts. These repeal efforts proved to be successful in 1883, when the Acts were suspended. The next year they were completely repealed.

Immigration of European prostitutes
In the early 20th Century, European prostitutes were visible in the major cities and seaports of British India.  As seaports became more prominent in India, more European women immigrated to serve as prostitutes. Many British authorities tolerated the immigration of European prostitutes in the hope that men would engage in sex with them, instead of Indian women.

Although, state-regulated prostitution was seen as a necessity to satisfy sailors and soldiers, European women constituted another racial crisis for the British authorities, giving rise to fears about sexual intercourse between “native” males and white women.  They perceived this type of sexual interaction as undermining to colonial hierarchies based on class and race.  They were even more anxious about the production of mixed-race children from such unions, as it threatened European racial purity.   However, there were fewer concerns about unions between British men and Indian women, although they too could and did produce children.

Generally, Indian women were not seen as violated or as victims when they engaged in prostitution with British men. Although sexual intercourse between British men and Indian women was acceptable, the British authorities preferred they interact with European women instead.  Stephen Edwardes, police commissioner of Bombay from 1909 to 1917, noted that brothels of European women were accepted so that British men did not have to engage in sexual relations with Indian women.  Growing social disapproval of sexual relations with Indian women compelled the authorities to accept prostitution as a necessary evil.

A concern for the welfare of prostitutes was mounting.  International forces were pressured to take action against the trafficking of women and girls.  However, this concern was primarily focused on European prostitutes.  There was a growing concern for “White Slavery”, a term that was coined in the 1880s to describe the international trafficking in European prostitutes.   A mass obsession grew over the concern for sexually pure European women who could be violated in “uncivilised lands” as the result of trafficking. Because of this concern for European women, both feminist and Christian abolitionist movements made the fight against “White Slavery”, a focal point in their respective agendas. 
 
In most cases, European prostitutes were considered “poor whites” or “low Europeans”, indicating their perceived low socio-economic class.    Evidence shows that many of the trafficked women, as well as their traffickers, were Jewish. References to these women as “low Europeans” or “less white” were often based in anti-Semitism. Terms such as “less white” denote an overall view that somehow these women were less valuable.
The League of Nations was also compelled to take action.  Due to mounting pressure, the League of Nations formed a committee to combat trafficking of European prostitutes.
Growing pressures forced the British imperial authorities to react.  The Criminal Law Amendment Act of 1912 was passed in response to hysteria over “White Slavery”.  This Act allowed for speedy legal action against pimps and traffickers and introduced harsher punishments for those procuring women for prostitution.   Ultimately, the British in India would bow down to the strains caused by the First World War and the abolitionist movements.   Brothels would only remain lawful in British India until the 1930s.

Religious clashes
The British were proactive in state legislation . But cultural misunderstandings contributed to how and to what extent practices regarded as prostitution by the British were regulated. One misunderstanding was British perception of Devadasis. These women, who were dedicated to Hindu temples, maintained sexual relations with men of high social status.  They were usually non-monogamous sexual relations with a variety of social elites. This offended the traditional British conceptions of marriage and moral conduct.  The sexual nature of the Devadasi occupation was widely condemned by most Britons. Therefore, British officials focused on the sexual roles of the Devadasis and encouraged laws against them. The British viewed the traditional Hindu practice of devoting certain young women to the temple as the exploitation of a minor for the purposes of prostitution, and from the 1860s onwards convictions for “temple harlotry” became increasingly common. The clash between British and Indian culture became increasingly apparent as the British legislators enforced more laws against Devadasi practices. Eventually, the Indian Penal Code included the Devadasi practice as a punishable offense. 
 
Although British moral sensibilities were no doubt disturbed by the sexual practices of Devadasis, they were also unaccustomed to the traditional rights Devadasis enjoyed.  Under Hindu Law, Devadasis were granted property and inheritance rights, often unheard of by women. 
Although certain forms of prostitution were permitted by the British, they eventually profiled Devadasis as an illegitimate form of prostitution.

Justification for prostitution
The British authorities offered several justifications for the British regulation of prostitution in colonial British India.  One justification of such state regulation of prostitution was the notion that prostitution was a vital safeguard against homosexuality.  Specifically, access to prostitutes was necessary to protect British military men from engaging in homosexual behaviour.  Therefore, military administrators approved of brothels in cantonments. One 1917 committee report by the Government of India claimed that homosexuality would invariably take hold if men were denied access to women.  This apparent fear of homosexuality had colonial roots.  Many European colonialists viewed homosexuality as perverse, "un-British"  behaviour, whereas they often believed that same-sex practices were “natural” to other "inferior" peoples, such as Indians, Arabs, and Africans.

The British saw another further need for prostitution, especially amongst the military. It was seen as necessary to stave off boredom among soldiers and to reinforce imperial dominance through sexual control of Indian women. The British preserved and regulated prostitution through mandatory licensing and medical examinations, not out of concern for prostitutes, but out of concern for their own military men.

View of Christian missionaries

Christian missionaries opposed the practice of prostitution in the Indian Empire. They also fought against the practice of child temple prostitution. Amy Carmichael, a Protestant missionary of the Church of England Zenana Missionary Society focused her efforts towards children who were "to be dedicated as temple prostitutes", resulting in the creation of the Dohnavur Fellowship, which rescued one thousand children, as well as operated a hospital and engaged in evangelism. After seeing the work of an Anglican religious order called the Wantage Sisters of Fulham, who devoted their lives to caring for prostitutes, Pandita Ramabai—a convert to Christianity—founded the Kripa Sadan (Home of Mercy), a center "for the rehabilitation of prostitutes in India."

See also
 Dance bar
 Mujra
 Nautch
 Tawaif
 Prostitution in India 
 Prostitution in Pakistan

References

Further reading
 

 
 

Kalpana Kannabiran. “Judiciary, Social Reform and Debate on ‘Religious Prostitution’ in Colonial India.” Economic and Political Weekly, vol. 30, no. 43, Economic and Political Weekly, 1995, pp. WS59–69,  
Legg, Stephen. “An Intimate and Imperial Feminism: Meliscent Shephard and the Regulation of Prostitution in Colonial India.” Environment and Planning D: Society and Space 28, no. 1 (February 2010): 68–94.  
Forbes, Geraldine Hancock. Review of Under the Raj: Prostitution in Colonial Bengal. Johns Hopkins University Press, Journal of Colonialism and Colonial History, vol. 2 no. 1, 2001. Project MUSE,  
Tambe, Ashwini. “The Elusive Ingénue: A Transnational Feminist Analysis of European Prostitution in Colonial Bombay.” Gender & Society 19, no. 2 (April 2005): 160–79.  

Leucci, T. (2005) “Priyadarshini Vijaisri. Recasting the Devadasi. Patterns of sacred prostitution in colonial India. New Delhi, Kanishka Publisher, 2004, 346 p.,” Annales. Histoire, Sciences Sociales. Cambridge University Press, 60(2), pp. 348–350. 
LEGG, S. T. E. P. H. E. N. (2012) “Stimulation, Segregation and Scandal: Geographies of Prostitution Regulation in British India, between Registration (1888) and Suppression (1923),” Modern Asian Studies. Cambridge University Press, 46(6), pp. 1459–1505. 

 
  

Prostitution in India
Colonial India
Society of India 
Indian culture  
India